Leonard Barber (3 July 1929 – February 1988) was an English footballer who played as a forward for Port Vale in the Football League. He played a minor role in the club's Third Division North title winning campaign in 1953–54.

Career
Barber played for Bury before joining Port Vale in June 1947. He made five Third Division South appearances for Gordon Hodgson's "Valiants" in 1949–50, and scored his first senior goal on 29 October, in a 3–0 win over Brighton & Hove Albion at The Old Recreation Ground. He played 14 games at the end of the 1950–51 season, scoring seven goals. He would have had a higher goal ratio if it wasn't for misfortune, as during a game against Crystal Palace on 9 April 1951 he managed to score four goals, but the game was abandoned after an hour's play due to excessive mud. It was speculated that Barber's natural ability to play in thick mud would have earned him even more goals during that particular game. He made 18 appearances in 1951–52, but only found the net twice. He played eight games in 1953–54, scoring two goals, as Freddie Steele's side won the Third Division North title. He featured twice in the Second Division in 1954–55, before he left Vale Park and was transferred to Cheshire County League side Northwich Victoria in July 1955. He later signed for Wellington Town.

Post-retirement
Barber went on to run a pub called 'The Labour in Vain' in Milton, Staffordshire.

Career statistics
Source:

Honours
Port Vale
Football League Third Division North: 1953–54

References

1929 births
1988 deaths
Footballers from Stoke-on-Trent
English footballers
Association football forwards
Bury F.C. players
Port Vale F.C. players
Northwich Victoria F.C. players
Telford United F.C. players
English Football League players